Corle is a surname. Notable people with the surname include:

Edwin Corle (1906–1956), American writer
Helen Freeman Corle (1886–1960), American actress

See also
Carle
Colle (surname)

Americanized surnames